Ardcroney Burial Mound is a burial mound (Linkardstown-type cist) located in County Tipperary, Ireland.

References

National Monuments in County Tipperary
Archaeological sites in County Tipperary